Luigi Petroselli (March 1, 1932 – October 7, 1981) was an Italian politician. He was born in Viterbo. He was mayor of Rome from 1979 until his death. He died in office.

References

1932 births
1981 deaths
20th-century Italian politicians
Mayors of Rome